Adusumalli is a village located in the Parchur mandal of Prakasam district (formerly in Guntur district; pre-1972), in the state of Andhra Pradesh, 

Villages in Prakasam district